The San Ramon Valley Fire Protection District provides fire protection and emergency medical services for the cities of Alamo, Blackhawk, Danville, Diablo, Camino Tassajara and San Ramon as well as southern areas of the Morgan Territory in California, United States.

History
The San Ramon Valley Fire Protection District was first started in 1912, when it was decided that a volunteer fire department needed to be organized to provide services to the community. This first department became known as the Danville Farm Defense Fire District.

In 1963, Contra Costa County reorganized its East County Fire Protection District into the San Ramon Fire Protection District, an independent district. This led to the Local Agency Formation Commission consolidating the two districts into one on July 1, 1980.

USAR Task Force 4

The district is part of Urban Search and Rescue California Task Force 4 (CA-TF4) which is one of eight FEMA Urban Search and Rescue Task Forces in California. The task force, which is based in Oakland, is sponsored by the Oakland Fire Department.

Stations and apparatus

References 

Fire
Fire
Fire protection districts in the United States
1963 establishments in California
Government agencies established in 1963
Government of Contra Costa County, California
Firefighting in California